The 2019 FIL Junior European Luge Championships took place under the auspices of the International Luge Federation at St. Moritz-Celerina Olympic Bobrun, St. Moritz, Switzerland from 18 to 19 January 2019.

Schedule
Four events were held.

Medalists

Medal table

References

FIL Junior European Luge Championships
FIL Junior European Luge Championships
FIL Junior European Luge Championships
Luge in Switzerland
FIL Junior European Luge Championships
International sports competitions hosted by Switzerland